Manglehorn is a 2014 American drama film directed by David Gordon Green and written by Paul Logan. The film stars Al Pacino, Holly Hunter, Harmony Korine, and Chris Messina. It was selected to compete for the Golden Lion at the 71st Venice International Film Festival. The film was released in theaters on June 19, 2015 by IFC Films.

Plot
A.J. Manglehorn is a reclusive Texas key-maker who spends his days caring for his cat, finding comfort in his work, and lamenting a long lost love. Enter kind-hearted bank teller Dawn whose interest in the eccentric Manglehorn may just be able to draw him out of his shell.

Cast
Al Pacino as A.J. Manglehorn
Holly Hunter as Dawn
Harmony Korine as Gary
Chris Messina as Jacob
Marisa Varela as Patricia
Skylar Gasper as Kylie

Production
The shooting of the film began on November 4, 2013 in Austin, Texas and the filming lasted for twenty-five days at different locations in the city. The film was scored by Austin post-rock band Explosions in the Sky and David Wingo.

Release
The film premiered in competition at the 71st Venice International Film Festival. It was also screened in the Special Presentations section at the 2014 Toronto International Film Festival. The film was released in theaters on June 19, 2015 by IFC Films.

Reception
Manglehorn received mixed reviews from critics. On Rotten Tomatoes, the film has a rating of 49%, based on 85 reviews, with a rating of 5.45/10. The consensus reads: "Manglehorn boasts a nicely understated performance from Al Pacino, but that isn't enough to compensate for a slight story and uneven script." On Metacritic, the film has a score of 56 out of 100, based on reviews from 26 critics, indicating "mixed or average reviews".

References

External links

2014 films
Films directed by David Gordon Green
Worldview Entertainment films
2014 independent films
2014 drama films
American drama films
2010s English-language films
2010s American films
Films scored by Explosions in the Sky